Sri Lanka competed at the 1980 Summer Olympics in Moscow, USSR.  From 1948 to 1972, the nation was known as Ceylon at the Olympic Games.

Athletics

Men's 4×400 metres Relay
 Dharmasena Samararatne, Kosala Sahabandu, Newton Perera, and Appunidage Premachandra
 Heat — 3:14.4 (→ did not advance)

References
Official Olympic Reports
Sri Lanka at the 1980 Moscow Summer Games

Nations at the 1980 Summer Olympics
1980
1980 in Sri Lankan sport